Odd Squad is an American-Canadian television series.

Odd Squad or The Odd Squad may also refer to:

 Odd Squad (film), a 1981 Italian war comedy film
 "The Odd Squad" (episode), an episode of The Fairly OddParents
 The former name of the Coughee Brothaz, a Southern hip-hop group